Warren Thomas Cummings (born 15 October 1980) is a Scottish former professional footballer who played as a defender. He played for Chelsea, AFC Bournemouth, West Bromwich Albion, Dundee United, Crawley Town, AFC Wimbledon, Poole Town and Havant & Waterlooville. Cummings also played once for the Scotland national football team, in 2002.

Club career
Cummings started his career at Chelsea but never made it into the first team, and instead was loaned out several times – AFC Bournemouth 2000–01, West Bromwich Albion 2000–01 and 2001–02, and Dundee United in 2002–03.

Following his return from the Dundee United loan spell, Cummings was again loaned to Bournemouth, for a three-month spell, before signing a permanent deal with the club. He went on to make 23 appearances for "The Cherries" in that season, helping them win promotion via the playoffs. In the following season he established himself as a first team player, making 46 appearances in total and scoring 2 goals.

The 2004–05 season brought a playoff push for "The Cherries", with Cummings playing an important part and scoring 3 goals. However, during an away derby with Swindon Town in March 2005, he suffered a double broken leg in a crunch tackle by Swindon's Steve Jenkins. This was a major blow to both Cummings and Bournemouth, and was a major factor in them failing in their playoff bid. Nonetheless, Cummings signed a new deal with Bournemouth in the summer of 2006. He made his league return as a late substitute in the 3–0 defeat to Chesterfield at the start of the 2006–07 campaign. In June 2007 Cummings signed a new two-year deal with Bournemouth. He broke his arm in a 1–1 draw with Northampton Town on 15 September 2007.

On 29 June 2012 it was announced that he has signed with League Two club AFC Wimbledon. He played a total of 9 league games for the "Dons" before being released from the club on 10 July 2013.

On 16 August 2013, Cummings joined Southern League Premier Division side Poole Town.

For his services to Bournemouth, Cummings received a testimonial match against AC Milan on 3 September 2016; the match marked the club debut for England star Jack Wilshere.

In July 2022, Cummings became Captain  of AFC Passelhona a local six-a-side team composed of legends of the game. He is currently one of the top scorers in the league scoring six goals in one game.

International career
Cummings won one Scotland cap, when he played in a Far East tour game against the Hong Kong League XI in May 2002. Scotland won the Reunification Cup match 4–0.

Honours
Individual
PFA Team of the Year: 2004–05 Football League One

References

External links

1980 births
Footballers from Aberdeen
Living people
Scottish footballers
Scotland international footballers
Association football defenders
Chelsea F.C. players
AFC Bournemouth players
West Bromwich Albion F.C. players
Dundee United F.C. players
Crawley Town F.C. players
AFC Wimbledon players
Poole Town F.C. players
English Football League players
National League (English football) players
Scottish Premier League players
Scotland under-21 international footballers
Havant & Waterlooville F.C. players
People educated at Bridge of Don Academy